McEneaney is a surname. Notable people with the surname include:

Eamon McEneaney (1954–2001), American lacrosse player
Eamonn McEneaney, Irish Gaelic football player and manager
Sarah McEneaney (born 1955), American artist
William McEneaney, American engineer

See also
McEneaney Field, stadium in Sioux Falls, South Dakota
McEnaney
McInerney